Hoseynabad-e Marakan (also Romanized as Ḩoseynābād-e Marākān; also known as Ḩoseyn‘alīkhān and Ḩoseyn Khān Kandī) is a village in Ivughli Rural District, Ivughli District, Khoy County, West Azerbaijan Province, Iran. At the 2006 census, its population was 22, in 4 families.

References 

Populated places in Khoy County